The Ikarus C52 is a German ultralight aircraft, designed and produced by Comco Ikarus, introduced at the Aero show held in Friedrichshafen in 2011. The aircraft is supplied as a complete ready-to-fly-aircraft.

Design and development
An evolution of the Ikarus C42, the C52 was designed to comply with the Fédération Aéronautique Internationale microlight rules. It not only updates the older design, but offers more comforts. The C-52 is not intended to replace the C42 in production, but instead to act as a higher-end complementary model. Like the C42, it features a strut-braced high-wing, a two-seats-in-side-by-side configuration enclosed open cockpit, fixed tricycle landing gear and a single engine in tractor configuration.

The aircraft differs from the earlier C42 primarily in that the landing gear is a cantilever design, the tail is constructed of carbon fibre and the engine mount was redesigned. Standard engines available are the  Rotax 912UL and the  Rotax 912ULS four-stroke powerplants.

Specifications (C-52 Club)

References

External links
Official website

2010s German ultralight aircraft
Single-engined tractor aircraft
High-wing aircraft